South Slocan is an unincorporated community in rural British Columbia with a population of approximately 100 people, many of whom are followers of the Doukhobors religion. It is located on the northwest shore of the Kootenay River in the West Kootenay region of southeastern British Columbia. The village comprises 51 households. Its postal category is Rural Route One.

Early settlement
South Slocan was originally called Ward's Ferry, Ward’s Crossing, and Ward's Bay. This crossing was a critical link on the trail between Nelson and Sproat's Landing. The rough hotel he erected was called the Rustle House, because the provisions were so meagre that guests needed to rustle the deficiency for sustenance. The earliest reference to Ward's Ferry was 1890, and Ward's Bay was 1891. Canadian Pacific Railway (CP) renamed the place as Slocan Junction in 1897, and South Slocan in 1912. Slocan Junction remained in popular use into the 1920s, and the school name did not change until 1931.

Railway
In 1897, CP opened the Columbia and Kootenay Railway (C&KR)  branch line from South Slocan up to Slocan City.

On the C&KR branch, passenger service ended around 1957 and the final freight run was in 1993, the rail bed since becoming the Slocan Valley Rail Trail. On the southern main line, passenger service ended around 1964.

Industry & later community
The 1928 opening of the South Slocan dam grew the settlement that became known as South Slocan Village. Although never incorporated, its commission of management functions like a council. The blurred boundaries now include parts of what might formerly have been considered Crescent Valley or Shoreacres. South Slocan is on the Kootenay, and not the Slocan, so is not generally regarded as being in the Slocan Valley. The Highway 3A/6 intersection is called Playmor Junction, but is virtually synonymous with South Slocan.

In 1976, the Kootenay Canal hydroelectric power station opened.

In 2019, Kalesnikoff Lumber erected a  multi species mass timber manufacturing facility. Reaching full production the next year, the state-of-the-art processing plant created around 50 new technology-centered jobs.

When the former school building (1929), which has been used for various community activities, came to the end of its useful life, demolition in 2021 was unavoidable.
Although the stores and hotels are long gone, St. Mathew's Anglican Church (1914), with its pseudo Gothic windows, alcove entrance and small bell tower atop the steeply pitched roof, still clings to the hillside along Slocan Village Road at the eastern edge.

Notable People

Kliph Nesteroff, best-selling author and television personality.
Shawn Hook, musician.

References

See also

Unincorporated settlements in British Columbia